Anuj Saxena is an Indian actor, model, producer, and businessman.

Saxena made his acting debut in the Sony TV soap opera Kkusum in 2001 and has appeared in eleven TV serials including Karm, Kumkum – Ek Pyara Sa Bandhan and Dekh Bhai Dekh. His first film appearance was in Chase in 2010. In 2005, he launched his own production house, Maverick Productions.

He married Ishmit Dhadial in 2004, but the couple divorced a year later.

Saxena is also the COO of pharmaceutical company Elder Pharmaceuticals, and was involved in a cheque bounce and fraud case related to the company. A bureaucrat (B.K. Bansal) investigating Elder Pharma fraud committed suicide in September 2016. The company had tried to bribe him earlier. Saxena is wanted by investigating agency CBI in the case, and a non-bailable warrant was issued by court for him in October 2016.

Television

Filmography

References

External links 
 

Indian male television actors
Living people
Male actors in Hindi cinema
Indian male stage actors
Indian television presenters
Indian male models
Indian male soap opera actors
21st-century Indian male actors
Indian chief operating officers
Male actors from Delhi
Year of birth missing (living people)